Simar is an unincorporated community in Solway Township, Saint Louis County, Minnesota, United States, located near Munger.

References

Unincorporated communities in Minnesota
Unincorporated communities in St. Louis County, Minnesota